Lei "Stanley" Qi (born August 17, 1983) is an assistant professor in the Department of Bioengineering, and the Department of Chemical and Systems Biology at Stanford University. Qi led the development of the first catalytically dead Cas9 lacking endonuclease activity (dCas9), which is the basis for CRISPR interference (CRISPRi). His laboratory subsequently developed CRISPR-Genome Organization (CRISPR-GO).

Qi is a co-inventor of the University of California patent on the CRISPR gene-editing technology.

Early life and education
Qi obtained his B.S. in physics and math from Tsinghua University, China, Master in physics from UC Berkeley, and PhD in bioengineering from UC Berkeley. During his PhD work at Berkeley, he studied synthetic biology with Adam Arkin, and was the first to explore  engineering the CRISPR for targeted gene editing and gene regulation with Jennifer Doudna. After PhD, he performed independent research work as a faculty fellow at UCSF. He joined the Stanford faculty in 2014.

Award
Qi has won awards, including NIH Director's Early Independence Award, Pew Biomedical Scholar, and Alfred. P. Sloan Fellowship.

References

External links 
 Qi Lab in Stanford
 Qi Lab in UCSF

1983 births
Living people
American bioengineers
Chinese bioengineers
Tsinghua University alumni
University of California, Berkeley alumni
Stanford University faculty
Synthetic biologists
American biochemists
Chinese biochemists
People from Weifang
Chemists from Shandong
Educators from Shandong
Biologists from Shandong
Chinese emigrants to the United States
Sloan Research Fellows
University of California, San Francisco faculty